Lilí del Mónico (1910-2002) was a Swiss artist active in Paraguay in the 1950s. Born in (Switzerland in 1910; Asuncion and he died in Asuncion on February 7, 2002)

First Steps 

Lilí del Mónico 1948 began taking painting lessons in oil painting at Lausanne (Switzerland) with Professor David Burner and in Asuncion with Jaime Bestard .

At the beginning of the decade of 1950 she held her first solo exhibition in the Paraguayan American Cultural Center (CCPA) in 1952 and participated in the Women's Hall of Fine Arts at the Union Club, both institutions of the Paraguayan capital.

Trajectory 

The year 1954 was crucial to work out the later Paraguayan visual arts. Lilí del Mónico performed with the New Art Group the first Art Exhibition of Modern Art in Asuncion in the windows of stores and shops on the street Palma, the main avenue of the capital down town.

That same year, the group formed by Josefina Plá, Jose Parodi Laterza and Olga Blinder presented an exposition in Buenos Aires in the Argentine Society of Plastic Artists.

This artist had since the beginning of her career intense participation in the cultural life of Paraguay. In 1960 she took part in several group exhibitions in Asuncion. In 1967 she made her second individual sample in the Kennedy Gallery. In 1968 he won the Gold Medal at the exhibition organized by the Society of Horticulture & Garden of Asuncion.

Also, in the years 1972, 1974, 1980 she organized solo exhibitions in the Paraguayan American Cultural Center. In 1975 she participated in the sample group "Women in Paraguayan plastic." In 1976 she exhibited in the Colonial Bookshop Gallery in Punta del Este, Uruguay. In 1980 she showed her oil paintings in an exhibit at the same individual Uruguayan seaside resort. In 1988  Lilí del Mónico exhibited in the Factory Gallery and made a show of paintings at the Gallery of Art-sans of Asuncion. She also could show her work in her homeland. So she took some pictures in which she focused on the female body to her country.

"Consistency internal" 

In the catalog for the presentation “Art-Sans” her colleague from the movement "Arte Nuevo” and friend Olga Blinder wrote:" Lilì was looking for her way and her findings were not accidental. The force is always constant inside her and, although her production is not constant and is governed by a line or technical issue, the strength of her paintings rely on their authenticity, which makes her paint the way she speaks and acts in her daily life. Lilí is like that, weather people like her or not and, therefore, her paintings reflected the same force that always pushed her, in all her endeavors.''

Plastic reflections 

 
As an exercise in reflection on her work and the path she walked by the group "New Art", Lilí del Mónico wrote the book "Between brush and reeds" this material was edited in Asuncion in 1990 and then translated into Italian.

Lil's Mónico also had another little-known facet; of the industry. He was at the controls of the sugar mills "Censi and Pirota S. A. ", in Benjamin Aceval Paraguayan Chaco. She was remembered as the first industrial woman of Paraguay.

The artist died in Benjamin Aceval on February 7, 2002, at age 92.

Collections 

The works of Lilí del Mónico are in the collection of the Museum of Contemporary Paraguayan Art Asuncion and in private collections in Paraguay, Argentina, Uruguay, U.S., Venezuela, Spain and Switzerland.

References 
 Cultural Center of the Republic El Cabildo
 Biographical Dictionary "Builders of Paraguay," First Edition January 2000. Distributed editions of Quevedo. Buenos Aires, Argentina.

External links 
 Onlinemad

1910 births
2002 deaths
20th-century Paraguayan painters
Swiss emigrants to Paraguay